The 1971 Virginia Tech Gobblers football team was an American football team that represented Virginia Tech as an independent during the 1971 NCAA University Division football season. In their first year under head coach Charlie Coffey, the Gobblers compiled an overall record of 4–7.

Schedule

Players
The following players were members of the 1971 football team according to the roster published in the 1972 edition of The Bugle, the Virginia Tech yearbook.

References

Virginia Tech
Virginia Tech Hokies football seasons
Virginia Tech Gobblers football